Georg Maximilian Sterzinsky (9 February 1936 – 30 June 2011) was a German cardinal of the Roman Catholic Church and the Archbishop of Berlin.

Early life
Sterzinsky was born in Warlack (earlier also Wurlacken, Warlaucken, now Worławki, Olsztyn County), Landkreis Heilsberg, in German East Prussia. He lost his mother as a child and his family took refuge in Thuringia, due to the expulsions following the end of World War II; his homeland of Warmia is now within Poland.

Priest and bishop
Sterzinsky was ordained a priest in 1960. After serving as a parish priest for fifteen years, he became Vicar General to the Bishop of Erfurt in 1981. In 1989, he himself was appointed Bishop of Berlin and, in 1994, he became Archbishop when that see was raised to Archdiocese.

Cardinal
Sterzinsky was proclaimed Cardinal-Priest of S. Giuseppe all'Aurelio on 28 June 1991. He was one of the cardinal electors who participated in the 2005 papal conclave that selected Pope Benedict XVI.

Pope Benedict XVI accepted Cardinal Sterzinsky's retirement as Metropolitan Archbishop of the Roman Catholic Archdiocese of Berlin on 24 February 2011, for reasons of age (he had reached the age limit of 75) and health.

No successor was immediately named for Cardinal Sterzinsky upon his retirement, so the Archdiocese of Berlin was a vacant see (sede vacante) at the time. Auxiliary Bishop Matthias Heinrich was appointed apostolic administrator until a new Archbishop was named.

In April 2011 Cardinal Sterzinsky was transferred to a rehabilitation clinic.  In May 2011 it was reported that his condition was very serious after he developed pneumonia and had to be brought from the rehabilitation centre back to the hospital. Cardinal Sterzinsky died on 30 June. Pope Benedict XVI sent a telegram of condolence to Auxiliary Bishop Heinrich, expressing his closeness to the people of the Archdiocese and praising Sterzinsky's efforts in serving the people of Berlin during the fall of the Berlin Wall and the transition to a united Germany.

On 2 July 2011, two days after the Cardinal's death, Pope Benedict XVI, named Rainer Maria Woelki as the new Metropolitan Archbishop of Berlin.

Views
In November 2004, Sterzinsky criticized the notion of "gay marriage". He argued in a sermon that it could be necessary for Catholics to protest and resist gay marriage laws "die dem Gesetz Gottes widersprechen" ("that are contradictory to the laws of God").

References

External links

Bio from the Vatican
Profile on Catholic Hierarchy

1936 births
2011 deaths
People from Olsztyn County
20th-century German cardinals
Roman Catholic bishops of Berlin
Archbishops of Berlin
21st-century German cardinals
People from East Prussia
Grand Crosses with Star and Sash of the Order of Merit of the Federal Republic of Germany
Cardinals created by Pope John Paul II
Burials at St. Hedwig's Cathedral